Poyntonophrynus dombensis (common name: Dombe toad or Dombe pygmy toad) is a species of toad in the family Bufonidae. It is found in southwestern Angola and northwestern Namibia.

Poyntonophrynus dombensis live in arid grassland areas with rock outcrops. It breeds in small, temporary streams and (presumably) pools. It is very common in suitable habitat and is facing no threats.

References

dombensis
Frogs of Africa
Amphibians of Angola
Amphibians of Namibia
Taxa named by José Vicente Barbosa du Bocage
Amphibians described in 1895
Taxonomy articles created by Polbot